Suan-Li Ong is a British Chinese actress and model best known for her portrayal of Isabel in NBC's Emerald City TV series. Other roles include that of Maggie Xiang in the Snatch TV series. Being a fully trained croupier having worked in London's West End and Mayfair enabled her to train her fellow actors in the James Bond production of Skyfall where she played the head croupier. She briefly appears, as one of Lex Luthor's bodyguards, in a post-credits scene in the 2017 film Justice League.

Early life 
Ong was born in London, England. Ong is of Southeast Asian ancestry.

Career

Modelling 
Ong began her modelling career at the age of 14 with Storm Model Management and continues to model to this day along with her acting. Her most recent work features in Afi Magazine's September 26, 2017 webitorial feature entitled “Kaleidoscope”. She appears as the digital model of Angel, a character in NaturalMotion's 2016 CSR Racing sequel, CSR2; a member of the Nu Fangz crew who players compete against to win her car. Prior to that Suan-Li appeared on the Volume One cover of Scorpio Jin magazine in the September 2015 issue.

Acting 
Ong trained on the 2 year Acting course at The Poor School in London. She has appeared in various shorts and television shows.

Filmography

Film

Television

Shorts

Video Games

References

External links 
 
 
 Suan-Li Ong on Twitter
 Suan-Li Ong on Vimeo
 Suan-Li Ong's C.V. on spotlight.com
 Suan-Li Ong on Mandy Actors

Living people
British female models
British actresses
Models from London
British actresses of Chinese descent
Actresses from London
English people of Chinese descent
Year of birth missing (living people)